Face the Nation is the third and final studio album by the American hip hop duo Kid 'n Play. It was released in 1991 via Select Records. 

The album peaked at number 144 on the Billboard 200 and number 27 on the Top R&B/Hip-Hop Albums. Its lead single, "Ain't Gonna Hurt Nobody", made it to number 41 on the Billboard Hot 100 and topped the Hot Rap Songs.

Production
The production was handled by Eric "Quicksilver" Johnson, Dana Mozie,  Pete Rock, Alain Blake, Andre Chambers, Hurby Luv Bug, Mark Eastmond, and Christopher Martin, who also served as executive producer together with Christopher Reid.

Critical reception
The Rolling Stone Album Guide wrote that "Kid 'N Play make the mistake of many rap has-beens, lecturing other rap acts without realizing how laughable their own sound has become." Billboard called the album "a grooving record that is enjoyable but lacks some of the charm of earlier efforts." The Washington Post acknowledged the album's more serious tracks, but wrote that the duo "refuse to conform and end up doing what they do best—be themselves ... That means throwing down upbeat, fun party songs such as 'Foreplay' and their latest hit 'Ain't Gonna Hurt Nobody'."

Track listing

Charts

References

External links

1991 albums
Kid 'n Play albums
Select Records albums
Albums produced by Pete Rock
Albums produced by Hurby Azor